Ekburji Dam, is an earthfill dam on Chandrabhaga river near Washim in the state of Maharashtra in India.

Specifications

Purpose
 Irrigation
 Water Supply for Washim town

See also
 Dams in Maharashtra
 List of reservoirs and dams in India

References

Dams in Washim district
Dams completed in 1964
1964 establishments in Maharashtra